The discography of British punk rock band the Damned includes eleven studio albums, twenty-two live albums, twenty-eight compilations, four box sets, five extended plays and forty-five singles.

Albums

Studio albums

Live albums

Compilation albums

Compilation appearances
 The Moonlight Tapes (1980)
The Whip (1983)
The Return Of The Living Dead (1985)
The History Of Rock Volume 31 (1985)
Live At Alice In Wonderland - A Pretty Smart Way To Catch A Lobster (1986)
The Punk Incident (1994)
The Best Punk Album In The World...Ever! (1995)
Punk - Lost & Found (1996)
The Chiswick Story: Adventures Of An Independent Record Label 1975-1982 (1996)
Industrial Mix Machine (1997)
Short Music For Short People (1999)
Punkzilla (2001)
Warped Tour - 2002 Compilation (2002)
 No Thanks! The '70s Punk Rebellion (2003)
Friends Reunited.co.uk The Class Of 1986 (2004)
Friends Reunited.co.uk The Class Of 1987 (2004)
 Hardcore Breakout USA 1,2,3,... (2004)
Ace 30th Birthday Celebration - Garage, Beat and Punk Rock (2005)
The Satanic Rights Of Dracula (2006)
 Hardcore Breakout – Essential Punk (2012)

Box sets

Extended plays

Singles

Videos

Video albums

Music videos

Notes

References

Discographies of British artists
Damned discography